Violet is the second Japanese extended play by South Korean boy group Pentagon, released on January 17, 2018 by Cube Entertainment Japan. The EP contains Japanese-language versions of their previous songs, the title track "Violet" from Demo_02 and "Beautiful" from Ceremony, and four original songs.

Background 
On November 16, 2017, it was announced that Pentagon would release their second Japanese EP on January 17, 2018. The track list and physical album types were also revealed on the same day. The EP was released early on January 6, exclusively on the music streaming service Line Music.

Commercial performance 

The week of the release, Violet took the number 1 spot on all of Tower Records' weekly album charts, and ranked fourth on Oricon's weekly album chart. The EP ranked number 8 on Tower Records' highest-selling Japanese albums by Korean artists in 2018. Violet placed tenth on Oricon's annual Indie Albums rankings for 2018.

Track listing

Charts

Sales

Release history

References

2018 EPs
Cube Entertainment EPs
Japanese-language EPs
Pentagon (South Korean band) EPs
Albums produced by Kino (singer)